Eugen Vollmar (31 January 1928 – 19 January 2016) was a Swiss rower. He competed in the men's eight event at the 1948 Summer Olympics.

References

1928 births
2016 deaths
Swiss male rowers
Olympic rowers of Switzerland
Rowers at the 1948 Summer Olympics
Place of birth missing